is the second studio album by the Japanese girl idol girl group Onyanko Club. It was released in Japan on March 10, 1986.

Track listing 

All lyrics, except "Yume no Hanataba", by Yasushi Akimoto.

Charts

Weekly charts

References 

Onyanko Club albums
1986 albums
Pony Canyon albums